Oxford Township is a now-defunct township in Philadelphia County, Pennsylvania. The township ceased to exist and was incorporated into the City of Philadelphia following the passage of the Act of Consolidation, 1854.

History
A township running from the county line in southeast direction to the Delaware River, and along the same southwest to Frankford Creek, and up the same northwestwardly to Tacony Creek (Tookany), which it followed until it reached the county line near were the northwestern boundary joined it. Frankford, Whitehall, Cedar Grove and Volunteer Town were in this township, and it also took in the former township of Tacony. Greatest length, 3 miles; greatest breadth, 4 miles; area, 7,680 acres (31 km2). It was one of the earliest townships established in Pennsylvania. The township was surrounded by the waters of the Delaware and Frankford Creek on two sides, and was traversed by the Little Tacony and Sissamocksink (Wissinoming) or Little Wahauk Creeks.

Resources
Chronology of the Political Subdivisions of the County of Philadelphia, 1683-1854
Information courtesy of ushistory.org
Incorporated District, Boroughs, and Townships in the County of Philadelphia, 1854 By Rudolph J. Walther - excerpted from the book at the ushistory.org website
Ellet, Charles, Jr. Map of the County of Philadelphia from Actual Survey, 1843.
Dripps, M. Map of the Township of Oxford, Boroughs of Frankford and Bridesburg, 1849.

Municipalities in Philadelphia County prior to the Act of Consolidation, 1854
1854 disestablishments in Pennsylvania